USCGC Escanaba (WMEC-907) is a United States Coast Guard medium endurance cutter based in Portsmouth, Virginia. Her keel was laid on April 1, 1983, at Robert Derecktor Shipyard Incorporated, Middletown, Rhode Island. She was launched February 6, 1985 and is named for her predecessor,  which sank during World War Two, and was named for the Escanaba River and Escanaba, Michigan. Escanaba (WMEC-907) was formally commissioned August 29, 1987 in Grand Haven, Michigan, the home port of her predecessor.

Service
A boarding party from Escanaba was engaged by the crew of a suspected drug smuggling go-fast boat on 14 September 2010. The go-fast escaped when it entered Nicaraguan waters, but no Coast Guard personnel were injured.

The Escanaba participated in the 2017 Joint Interagency Task Force South with various other naval forces. During the exercise the Escanaba interdicted 2 smuggling vessels, the cutter also participated in numerous exercises at sea focusing on various warfare areas including maritime interdiction operations, naval gun-fire support, tactical maneuvering and formation steaming, and search and rescue.

Between the 20th and 21 May 2019, Escanaba interdicted three small vessels in the Mona Pass carrying 68 migrants attempting to reach Puerto Rico from the Dominican Republic. The first two vessels were detected by the crew of a U.S. Customs and Border Protection DHC-8 maritime patrol aircraft on the night of 20 May 2019. The first boat was located 43 nautical miles north of Aguadilla, Puerto Rico, while the second was detected approximately 15 nautical miles northwest of Desecheo Island, Puerto Rico. Both vessels were transiting the Mona Pass without navigational lights. Coast Guard Watchstanders in Sector San Juan diverted the Escanaba to interdict the suspect vessels. Shortly thereafter, the Escanaba interdicted a 20-foot makeshift boat with 19 adult migrants on board.  The Escanaba crew embarked 14 men and five women, who claimed Dominican nationality. Following the first interdiction, the Escanaba proceeded to intercept the second migrant vessel.  Once on scene, an Escanaba small boat crew and a CBP Caribbean Air and Marine interceptor surface unit stopped a 25-foot makeshift boat with 21 adult migrants on board. The Escanaba crew embarked 18 men and three women of Dominican nationality. The third vessel to be interdicted was detected by the crew of a CBP DHC-8 maritime patrol aircraft on the night of 21 May 2019, approximately 20 nautical miles northwest of Aguadilla.  The Escanaba crew interdicted the 30-foot makeshift boat and safely embarked 28 adult migrants, 21 men and seven women of Dominican nationality, as well as a Haitian man. 66 of the migrants were transferred to a Dominican Republic Navy vessel for repatriation. Two migrants facing felony criminal charges for attempted illegal reentry into a U.S. territory, one Dominican Republic man and one Haitian man, were transferred to USCGC Richard Dixon (WPB-1113) for further transfer to Ramey Sector Border Patrol agents in Mayaguez, Puerto Rico.

Images

References

External links
Escanaba home page, with links to history and photo pages
 Roll of Honor

Ships of the United States Coast Guard
Famous-class cutters
1985 ships
Ships built in Middletown, Rhode Island